Gádor is a municipality of Almería province, in the autonomous community of Andalusia, Spain. The murder of Bernardo Gonzalez Parra by Francisco Leona happened on 28 June 1910 in Gádor.

Demographics

References

Municipalities in the Province of Almería